In algebra, a graded-commutative ring (also called a skew-commutative ring) is a graded ring that is commutative in the graded sense; that is, homogeneous elements x, y satisfy

where |x&hairsp;| and |y&hairsp;| denote the degrees of x and y.

A commutative (non-graded) ring, with trivial grading, is a basic example. An exterior algebra is an example of a graded-commutative ring that is not commutative in the non-graded sense.

A cup product on cohomology satisfies the skew-commutative relation; hence, a cohomology ring is graded-commutative. In fact, many examples of graded-commutative rings come from algebraic topology and homological algebra.

References 
 David Eisenbud, Commutative Algebra. With a view toward algebraic geometry, Graduate Texts in Mathematics, vol 150, Springer-Verlag, New York, 1995.

See also 
DG algebra
graded-symmetric algebra
alternating algebra
supercommutative algebra

Abstract algebra